Miss Malaysia World 2014, the 48th edition of Miss World Malaysia was held at the Corus Hotel, Kuala Lumpur on August 30, 2014. Melinder Bhullar of Kuala Lumpur crowned her successor, Dewi Liana Seriestha from Sarawak at the end of the event.

Twenty-one contestants from different states competed for the crown. Dewi then represented Malaysia at the Miss World 2014 held in London, United Kingdom where she received the Miss World Talent 2014 award and made it to the Top 25 quarter-finalist.

Results

Special awards

Contestants 
21 contestants competed for the crown and title.

References

External links

 

Beauty pageants in Malaysia
2014 beauty pageants
2014